The Saint Vincent and the Grenadines women's national volleyball team represents Saint Vincent and the Grenadines in international women's volleyball competitions and friendly matches.

References
 Saint Vincent and the Grenadines women's national volleyball team

National women's volleyball teams
Volleyball
Volleyball in Saint Vincent and the Grenadines
Women's sport in Saint Vincent and the Grenadines